Sholto Kynoch is an English pianist.

Biography 
Born in London, Kynoch attended Ampleforth College before reading music at Worcester College, Oxford, where he was organ scholar. He studied piano accompaniment at the Royal Academy of Music and the Guildhall School of Music and Drama; his teachers have included Michael Dussek, Graham Johnson, Malcolm Martineau, Ronan O'Hora and Vanessa Latarche.

He is the founder and artistic director of the Oxford Lieder Festival, and is the pianist of the Phoenix Piano Trio.

Discography 
Hugo Wolf - the complete songs - volume 5: Heine, Reinick, Shakespeare & Byron (with Sarah-Jane Brandon - soprano, Daniel Norman - tenor & William Dazeley - baritone), Stone Records 2013
Beethoven piano trios (with Phoenix Piano Trio), Stone Records 2012
Hugo Wolf - the complete songs - volume 4: Keller, Fallersleben, Ibsen & other poets (with Mary Bevan - soprano, & Quirijn de Lang - baritone), Stone Records 2012
Hugo Wolf - the complete songs - volume 3: Italienisches Liederbuch (with Geraldine McGreevy - soprano, & Mark Stone - baritone), Stone Records 2012
Hugo Wolf - the complete songs - volume 2: Mörike Lieder part 2 (with Sophie Daneman - soprano, Anna Grevelius - mezzo-soprano, James Gilchrist - tenor, & Stephan Loges - baritone), Stone Records 2011
Hugo Wolf - the complete songs - volume 1: Mörike Lieder part 1 (with Sophie Daneman - soprano, Anna Grevelius - mezzo-soprano, James Gilchrist - tenor, & Stephan Loges - baritone), Stone Records 2011
Fantasy (with Kaoru Yamada - violin), Stone Records 2010

References 
 
Interview with Kynoch
Violin recital CD Review in The Guardian
Wolf Lieder CD Review in The Guardian
Bangor TV interview with Kynoch
Oxford Lieder Festival website
Stone Records website

British classical pianists
Male classical pianists
Living people
Accompanists
21st-century classical pianists
Year of birth missing (living people)
21st-century British male musicians
People educated at Ampleforth College
Alumni of Worcester College, Oxford